Préseau is a commune in the Nord department of northern France.

Heraldry

History

Préseau is first mentioned in 1173 when the place is called "Presel", meadow in Old French. Only in 1724 was the name Préseau definitely chosen.

In the first half of the fifteenth century, the tiny village has a total of 22 "feux", meaning 22 houses. The inhabitants essentially live off the land since their principal activity is agriculture. Documents containing the fiefs held by the count of Hainaut testify the building of a kiln belonging to the count which stays up for all the fifteenth century.

Préseau was one of the six peerages of the county of Valenciennes. A peerage is inherited from father to son by virtue of blood link.

On October 9th 1918, Canadian pilot Captain Lynn Campbell and his machine-gunner 2nd Lieutenant William Hodgkinson of the Royal Air Force (Royal Flying Corps) are shot down in their Bristol Fighter above Préseau by Paul Bäumer of Jasta 2. They are buried in the cemetery, left to the calvary behind the church.

Administration

List of recent mayors :

 Jean-Marc Richard : 2001-2014 Ind.
 Sandrine François Lagny : 2014-2026 Ind.

Landmarks

 The village used to have a castle, now in ruins, but few lords ever dwelled there.
 The Church of Sainte Aldegonde, built in 1866. Inside can be found a wide variety of statues.
 A calvary built in 1833, the chapel of Notre-Dame-de-Bon-Voyage and other secondary chapels.
 The war memorial in remembrance of the seventy-two soldiers killed during the First World War.
 The British cemetery with the 107 graves of the British soldiers who died during the battle for the village in 1918.
 The old brewery.

Local customs

 Local dish : the "tarte à prones" (plum pie).
 Folk song : Vive Persiais (Préseau in the local dialect)

See also
Communes of the Nord department

References

 SCUFFLAIRE Andrée, Les fiefs directs des comtes de Hainaut de 1349 à 1504 : essai d’inventaire statistique et géographique. Tome 2 : Prévôté de Mons, Prévôté de Valenciennes, Bruxelles, Archives Générales du Royaume, 1978, p. 384-385.

External links
Official website

Communes of Nord (French department)